There are over 20,000 Grade II* listed buildings in England. This page is a list of these buildings in the district of the City of York in North Yorkshire.

List of buildings

|}

See also
 Grade I listed buildings in the City of York

Notes

References

External links

Lists of Grade II* listed buildings in North Yorkshire
Grade II* listed buildings in the City of York